Rachini Road is a road in inner Bangkok (Rattanakosin Island), located in Phra Borom Maha Ratchawang Subdistrict of Phra Nakhon District.

It begins at Sanam Chai Road, at the corners of the Rajini School, Charoenrat 31 Bridge, Phra Ratchawang Police Station, Wat Rajabopit School, and Sanam Chai MRT Station (exit 4) in the area of Pak Khlong Talat. It runs parallel to Khlong Lot, also known as Khlong Khu Mueang Doem and Atsadang Road as far as reaching Sanam Luang, where it cuts across Ratchadamnoen Avenue (section inner Ratchadamnoen) as far as terminating at Tha Chang Wang Na pier under the Phra Pinklao Bridge, where it meets Phra Athit Road.

This road can be considered as one of the oldest roads in Bangkok and as a road around the outer walls of the Grand Palace. Originally, it was only a dirt road and has no official name. Until the King Chulalongkorn (Rama V)'s reign, after the king returned from visiting Java and Singapore and saw the progress of roads in both countries. He ordered improvements in many roads in Bangkok, including this road too.

Its name literally meaning "The Queen's Road" in honour of the Queen Saovabha Phongsri, as she was a regent when the king had visited Europe in 1897.

Rachini Road runs through historic and important places such as Bangkok Land Office, Ubonrat Bridge, Chao Por Ho Klong Shrine, Territorial Defense Command, Charoen Krung Road, Saranrom Park, Saphan Mon, Saphan Hok, Pig Memorial and Pi Kun Bridge, Royal Thai Survey Department, Wat Ratchapradit, Kanlayana Maitri Road and Saphan Chang Rong Si with Ministry of Defence Headquarters, Charoen Sri 34 Bridge, Supreme Court, Phra Mae Thorani Shrine, Phan Phiphop Lila Bridge, World War I Volunteer Monument
, National Theatre, Wat Bowon Sathan Sutthawat and Bunditpatanasilpa Institute, respectively. 

The road also serves as terminal of BMTA and affiliated bus lines: 2, 25, 33, 47, 60, 64, and 53, 59, 82, 503 on Sanam Luang side.

In addition, the tip of the road is about 200 m (656 ft) long in front of the National Theatre and Wat Bowon Sathan Sutthawat is shady with many trees similar to a tunnel.

References

Phra Nakhon district
Streets in Bangkok